(German, 'Devil's Lake') is a glacial lake in the Grunewald forest in the Berlin borough of Charlottenburg-Wilmersdorf.

The European bitterling, classified as "very vulnerable" in Germany can be found in the lake; fishing is prohibited by law. Nude bathing is permitted at the lake as in many parts of Germany.

References

Charlottenburg-Wilmersdorf
Glacial lakes of Germany
Lakes of Berlin
Protected areas of Berlin